Charles of Hesse-Kassel (3 August 1654 – 23 March 1730), of the House of Hesse, was the Landgrave of Hesse-Kassel from 1670 to 1730.

Childhood 

Charles was the second son of William VI, Landgrave of Hesse-Kassel, and Hedwig Sophia of Brandenburg (1623–1683).  Until 1675 his mother ruled as his guardian and regent before Charles was old enough to take over the administration for the next 5 years.  His older brother, William VII, had died in 1670 shortly after reaching adulthood, even before he had had the chance to make any changes with the administration.

Policies 

Under the reign of Charles, the consequences of the Thirty Years' War in the agricultural county could be overcome more quickly than they were in the more industrialized regions of the Holy Roman Empire.  He pushed for the recreation of a large army and put it in the service of other countries in the War of Spanish Succession.   His soldiers, he gave, as well as other princes of his time, to foreign service for the Subsidiengelder [ subsidies ].  This policy remained controversial for its dealings with the mercenaries, according to the 1908 Brockhaus (Volume 9, page 96) :

"Dieses System verbesserte die Finanzen, aber nicht den Wohlstand des Landes,und brachte den glänzenden Hof selbst in ausländische Familienverbindungen."
[ This system improved the finances but not the prosperity of the country,and brought to the brilliant court itself foreign familial connections. ]

Charles left in 1685 to his younger brother Philipp as the latter's Paragium a small part of the Landgraviate of Hesse, the so-called Landgraviate of Hesse–Philippsthal, named after Philippsthal [ "Philipp's Valley" ] (formerly Kreuzberg, a place near Vacha on the Werra River).

Economy 

Even before the Edict of Fontainebleau (October 1685), Charles adopted on 18 April 1685 the Freiheits-Concession [ "Freedom Concession" ], promising the exiles from France, the Huguenots and Waldensians, free settlement and their own churches and schools.  In the following years, about 4000 the Protestants fled persecution in their homelands for Northern Hesse and, for example, about 1700 of them settled in Oberneustadt, the newly created borough of Kassel.

Following the ideas of mercantilism, Charles founded in 1679 the Messinghof, one of the first metal-processing plants in Hesse, in Bettenhausen, east of Kassel.

In 1699 Charles founded Sieburg (since 1717 Karlshafen) and also moved some of the Huguenots and Waldensians there.  With the construction of the Landgrave-Carl-Canal from the Diemel River to Kassel (and beyond), he tried to circumvent the existing customs borders but, after only a few kilometers, the construction was discontinued.

Culture 

Landgrave Charles continued the design of the hillside park, Wilhelmshöhe ("William's Peak") in the Habichtswald ("Hawk Forest"), now a nature preserve west of Kassel. In particular, it was the construction of the Hercules monument that brought the Italian-inspired cascades and other water features to the park. Under his rule, the Moritzaue ("Maurice's Meadow") park near the town was extended over a large area to another park, the Karlsaue ("Charles's Meadow"), which still exists today, and the Schloss Orangerie was built.

With the participation of the Landgrave, who was interested in history, the first archaeological excavations began in 1709 on the Mader Heide.

Family 
Charles married his first cousin, Maria Amalia of Courland (1653–1711), the daughter of Jacob Kettler, Duke of Courland, and had with her 24 children, fourteen of which lived long enough to have names:

 William (29 March 1674 – 25 July 1676)
 Charles (24 February 1675 – 7 December 1677)
 Friedrich (28 April 1676 – 5 April 1751), who succeeded his father as Frederick, the Landgrave of Hesse-Kassel, and became, in 1720, the King of Sweden
∞ 1 1700 Princess Louisa Dorothea of Brandenburg (1680–1705)
∞ 2 1715 Ulrika Eleonora, Queen of Sweden (1688–1741)
 Christian (2 July 1677 – 18 September 1677)
 Sophie Charlotte (16 July 1678 – 30 May 1749)
∞ 1704 Frederick William, Duke of Mecklenburg-Schwerin (1675–1713)
 Son (12 June 1679)
 Charles (12 June 1680 – 13 November 1702)
 Daughter (12 April 1681)
 William (10 March 1682 – 1 February 1760), who succeeded his brother Frederick as William VIII, the Landgrave of Hesse-Kassel
∞ 1717 Dorothea Wilhelmina of Saxe-Zeitz (1691–1743)
 Daughter (12 June 1683)
 Leopold (30 December 1684 – 10 September 1704)
 Son (12 November 1685)
 Louis (5 September 1686 – 23 May 1706)
 Marie Louise (7 February 1688 – 9 April 1765)
∞ 1709 Johan Willem Friso, Prince of Orange (1687–1711)
 Maximilian (28 May 1689 – 8 May 1753)
∞ 1720 Friederike Landgravine of Hesse-Darmstadt (1698–1777)
 Daughter (5 July 1690)
 George Charles (8 January 1691 – 5 March 1755)
 Son (1692)
 Eleonore Antoine (11 January 1694 – 17 December 1694)
 Wilhelmine Charlotte (8 July 1695 – 27 November 1722)
 Son (1696)
 Daughter (1697)
 Son (1699)
 Daughter (1701)

Other Relationships 
After the death of his wife in 1713, Charles had a relationship with Jeanne Marguerite de Frere, Marquise de Langallerie, with whom he had a son, Charles Frederic Philippe de Gentil, Marquis de Langallerie, who died early.  Charles secured in the same way the financial security of children who had come with his mistress.

After the Marquise de Langallerie, the next mistress and confidante was Barbara Christine von Bernhold (1690–1756), who rose to Großhofmeisterin ("Senior Mistress of the Court") under Charles's son William VIII and was raised to the rank of Reichsgräfin ("Imperial Countess") in 1742 by the Holy Roman Emperor Charles VII. She was housed in the Bellevue Palace.

Ancestry

References

Bibliography 
  [Theodor] Ilgen, "Karl",  "Allgemeine Deutsche Biographie [ General German Biography ] (ADB), Band 15 [ Volume 15 ] (Leipzig:  Duncker & Humblot, 1882), pages 292–296
  Hans Philippi,  Landgraf Karl von Hessen-Kassel. Ein deutscher Fürst der Barockzeit [ Landgrave Charles of Hesse-Kassel:  A German Prince of the Baroque Times ] (Veröffentlichungen der Historischen Kommission für Hessen, Number 34 [ Publications of the Historical Commission of Hesse, Number 34 ]) (Marburg:  Elwert, 1976), 
  Hans Philippi, "Karl", Neue Deutsche Biographie [ New German Biography ] (NDB), Band 11 [ Volume 11 ] (Berlin:  Duncker & Humblot, 1977), pages 227-229 (digitized)
  Pauline Puppel, Die Regentin. Vormundschaftliche Herrschaft in Hessen 1500–1700 [ The Lady Regents:  Reigning Guardianship in Hesse 1500-1700 ] (Frankfurt am Main:  Campus, 2004), pages 236–277

|-

Landgraves of Hesse-Kassel
People from the Landgraviate of Hesse-Kassel
1654 births
1730 deaths
German Calvinist and Reformed Christians
Landgraves of Hesse
17th-century German people
18th-century German people